

1968 engines 

* NOTE: Listed as an option, but no cars produced with this engine 
** NOTE: Mid-year option

1969 engines 

*NOTE: Available with Ram Air Induction option
**NOTE: VIN code 'R' with Ram Air

1970 engines 

*NOTE: Available with Ram Air Induction option
**NOTE: VIN code 'J' with Ram Air

1971 engines 

*NOTE: Available with Ram Air Induction option
**NOTE: VIN code 'J' with Ram Air

1972 engines 

Beginning in 1972 all Ford engines were rated SAE Net BHP and SAE net Torque, as installed in the vehicle

*NOTE: Available 2-door models only, Ram Air Induction optional
**NOTE: Ram Air Induction optional
***NOTE: Available with police "Interceptor" package only

1973 engines 

*NOTE: Available in 2-door models only 
**NOTE: Available with police "Interceptor" package only

1974 engines 

*NOTE: Available in 2-door models only, not available in Gran Torino Elite
**NOTE: Available with police "Interceptor" package only

1975 engines 

*NOTE: Available with police "Interceptor" package only

1976 engines 

*NOTE: Available with police "Interceptor" package only

Ford vehicles

References 
 
 Brokaw, Jim. "The Invisible Cars - 350 Chevelle vs 351 Torino vs 318 Satellite". Motor Trend, June 1971
 Brokaw, Jim. "The Long and the Short of It". Motor Trend, March 1972
 
 
 Motor Repair Manual. Auto Repair Manual 1974–1979
 Chilton's Repair Manual. Auto Repair Manual 1972–1979